J.H. Ambani Saraswati Vidyamandir is a Central Board of Secondary Education-affiliated) school located on Udhna Magdalla-Road, Surat, Gujarat, India. J.H Ambani Saraswati VidyaMandir is a school affiliated to the Central Board of Secondary Education (CBSE) on Provisional basis since 1995.

The current principal of the school is Dr. S.Antony Raj. The vice principal is Mrs. Preeti Singhal.

References 

Schools in Gujarat
Education in Surat